Asier Garitano Aguirrezábal (born 6 December 1969) is a Spanish football manager and former player who played as a forward.

During a 14-year senior career, he appeared in 134 matches in Segunda División over five seasons, totalling 23 goals for Bilbao Athletic and Eibar. He added 216 games and 61 goals in Segunda División B, in representation of several clubs.

Garitano started working as a manager in 2003, as an assistant at Alicante. He went on to be in charge of four teams before being appointed at Leganés in 2013, which he led to promotions to the second tier and La Liga. He was head coach at Real Sociedad and Alavés, also in the top flight.

Playing career
Born in Bergara, Gipuzkoa, Basque Country, Garitano was an Athletic Bilbao youth graduate. He made his senior debut with the reserves on 2 September 1989, starting and scoring the winner in a 2–1 away win against Racing de Santander in the Segunda División championship.

After four full seasons (one of them on loan at SD Eibar), Garitano left the Lions and signed for Cartagena FC in Segunda División B. In 1994, he moved to Cádiz CF also in the third division, and returned to Eibar in January 1996.

Garitano subsequently resumed his career in the third tier and Tercera División, representing CF Gavà, Racing de Ferrol, Burgos CF, Alicante CF and Benidorm CF. He retired in 2003 at the age of 33, mainly due to injuries.

Coaching career
Shortly after retiring, Garitano started working as an assistant manager at former club Alicante. In October 2008 he was named manager, replacing the fired José Carlos Granero. However, after only three matches, he was replaced by Nino Lema and moved to the backroom staff.

Garitano was appointed CD Castellón manager on 6 April 2010, after being previously working at the club as an assistant. He remained in charge until the end of the season, suffering relegation as last.

On 7 July 2011, Garitano signed with third division side Orihuela CF. The following campaign, also as manager, he worked with CD Alcoyano, eventually losing promotion with both teams in the play-offs.

On 28 June 2013, Garitano was named manager of CD Leganés still in the third tier. In his first season, he achieved promotion to division two after defeating CE L'Hospitalet in the play-offs; another promotion followed in 2016, after finishing second in the regular season.

On 24 May 2018, Garitano was appointed at the helm of Real Sociedad. On 26 December of the same year, he was dismissed following a poor sequence of results.

Garitano became manager of Deportivo Alavés on 21 May 2019, replacing Abelardo who had resigned a day earlier. He was fired on 5 July the next year, after a run of five consecutive defeats.

On 27 January 2021, Garitano returned to Leganés, with the club back in the second division. He was sacked on 30 October, leaving the side in the relegation zone.

Personal life
Garitano is not related to fellow manager Gaizka Garitano, who also had playing spells with Bilbao Athletic and Eibar.

Managerial statistics

References

External links

Stats at Cadistas1910 
Racing de Ferrol profile 

1969 births
Living people
People from Bergara
Spanish footballers
Footballers from the Basque Country (autonomous community)
Association football forwards
Segunda División players
Segunda División B players
Bilbao Athletic footballers
SD Eibar footballers
Cartagena FC players
Cádiz CF players
CF Gavà players
Racing de Ferrol footballers
Burgos CF footballers
Alicante CF footballers
Benidorm CF footballers
Spain youth international footballers
Spanish football managers
La Liga managers
Segunda División managers
Segunda División B managers
Alicante CF managers
CD Castellón managers
CD Alcoyano managers
CD Leganés managers
Real Sociedad managers
Deportivo Alavés managers